Miejska Górka  is a town in Rawicz County, Greater Poland Voivodeship, Poland.

References

External links
Municipal website 

Cities and towns in Greater Poland Voivodeship
Rawicz County